Buto (Butu), Bouto, Butus (Boutos) or Butosus was a city that the Ancient Egyptians called Per-Wadjet. It was located 95 km east of Alexandria in the Nile Delta of Egypt. What in classical times the Greeks called Buto, stood about midway between the Taly (Bolbitine) and Thermuthiac (Sebennytic) branches of the Nile, a few kilometers north of the east-west Butic River and on the southern shore of the Butic Lake (Boutikē limnē).

Today, it is called Tell El Fara'in ("Hill of the Pharaohs"), near the villages of Ibtu (or Abtu), Kom Butu, and the city of Desouk.

History 
Buto  was a sacred site in dedication to the goddess Wadjet and was an important cultural site during prehistoric Egypt, from the Paleolithic to 3100 BC. 

Buto-Maadi culture was the most important Lower Egyptian prehistoric culture, dating from 4000 - 3500, and contemporary with Naqada I and II phases in Upper Egypt. The culture was best known from the site Maadi near Cairo, but was also attested in many other places in the Delta to the Faiyum region. This culture was marked by development in architecture and technology.

Archaeological evidence seems to show that Upper Egyptian Naqada culture replaced Buto-Maadi culture (also known as the Lower Egyptian Cultural Complex), perhaps after a conquest. But, more recently, scholars have expressed reservations about this; they pointed out that, at the delta, there was a considerable transitional phase.

The unification of Lower Egypt and Upper Egypt into one entity is now considered to be a more complex process than previously thought.

Earliest texts 
In the earliest records about the region, it contained two cities, Pe and Dep. Eventually, they merged into one city that the Ancient Egyptians named Per-Wadjet.

The goddess Wadjet was the patron deity of Lower Egypt and her oracle was located in her renowned temple in this area. An annual festival was held there that celebrated Wadjet. The area also contained sanctuaries of Horus and Bast, and much later, the city became associated with Isis.

At that time, many deities had parallel identities and roles, yet merged into a unified pantheon of deities due to the great similarities. That was not the case with patron deities, however. The patron deity of Lower Egypt, Wadjet, was represented as a cobra. The patron deity of Upper Egypt, Nekhbet, was represented as a white vulture. Their separate cultural statures were such important features that they never were merged when the two cultures unified into one, as were so many deities with similar roles or natures from religious beliefs of the two unified regions. The two goddesses became known euphemistically as the 'Two Ladies', who together, remained the patrons of unified Egypt throughout the remainder of its ancient history. The image of Nekhbet joined Wadjet on the Uraeus that would encircle the crown of the kings who ruled Ancient Egypt thereafter.

Ptolemaic period 
During foreign occupation of Egypt under the Ptolemaic Kingdom, a dynasty that ruled from 305 to 30 BC, the classical Greeks coined the toponym Buto for the city. It served as the capital, or according to Herodian, merely the principal village of the Nile Delta. Herodotus styled it the Chemmite nome, Ptolemy knew it as the Phthenothite nome, and Pliny the Elder as Ptenetha.

Greek historians recorded that Buto was celebrated for its monolithite temple and the oracle of the goddess Wadjet (Buto), and that a yearly festival was held there in honour of the goddess. While writing about Egyptian culture, the classical Greeks attempted to associate the more ancient Egyptian deities with their own. They wrote about them as essentially the same deities, but with different names in the Greek culture. For Wadjet the parallel identification was made with the Greek Leto or Latona. They also noted that at Buto there was a sanctuary of Horus (whom the ancient Greeks associated with Apollo) and a sanctuary of Bast (whom the Greeks associated with Artemis).

Writing during that Graeco-Roman period, Plutarch reported that Isis had entrusted the baby Horus to "Leto" (Wadjet) to raise at Buto while Isis searched for the body of her murdered husband Osiris. According to these same late sources, the shrew (sometimes associated with Horus) was worshiped at Buto as well.

Archeological findings 
A palace building dating to the Second Dynasty is considered one of the most important discoveries within Buto. Archaeological excavations were undertaken at Buto by the Egypt Exploration Society from 1964–1969, under the direction of Veronica Seton-Williams and later, by Dorothy Charlesworth. The German Archaeological Institute, Cairo has been excavating at Buto since the early 1980s. Six Greek bathhouses also were excavated by different missions in Buto.

In 2022, excavations over an area of 6.5m x 4.5m uncovered the remains of an ancient hall lined with pillars within the larger temple structure. The hall contained the remains of three surviving columns, aligned on a north-south axis at the southwestern end of the temple. A number of stone fragments decorated with engravings where found, as well as numerous ceramics and pottery associated with ritual activity. In a press release issued by the Ministry of Tourism and Antiquities, archaeologists also found a limestone painting with the representation of a bird’s head wearing a white crown surrounded by feathers.

See also 

 List of ancient Egyptian towns and cities
 Diocese of Buto for ecclesiastical history and current titular sees
 Kafr El Sheikh Governorate
 Sais, Egypt

References

External links

Ptolemaic colonies
Archaeological sites in Egypt
Ruins in Egypt
Former populated places in Egypt
Nile Delta
Tells (archaeology)
Desouk
Cities in ancient Egypt
Former capitals of Egypt
Egyptian mythology
Egyptology
Archaeological discoveries with year of discovery missing
Wadjet